In topology, the Phragmén–Brouwer theorem, introduced by Lars Edvard Phragmén and Luitzen Egbertus Jan Brouwer, states that if X is a normal connected locally connected topological space, then the following two properties are equivalent:
If A and B are disjoint closed subsets whose union separates X, then either A or B separates X.
X is unicoherent, meaning that if X is the union of two closed connected subsets, then their intersection is connected or empty.

The theorem remains true with the weaker condition that A and B be separated.

References

 García-Maynez, A. and Illanes, A. ‘A survey of multicoherence’, An. Inst. Autonoma Mexico 29 (1989) 17–67.
 
   Wilder, R. L. Topology of manifolds, AMS Colloquium Publications, Volume 32. American Mathematical Society, New York (1949).

Theorems in topology
Trees (topology)